The European Summer School in Logic, Language and Information (ESSLLI) is an annual academic conference organized by the European Association for Logic, Language and Information. The focus of study is the "interface between linguistics, logic and computation, with special emphasis on human linguistic and cognitive ability". The conference is held over two weeks of the European Summer, and offers about 50 courses at introductory and advanced levels. It attracts around 500 participants from all over the world.

Venues

See also 
 Dynamic semantics
 Generalized quantifier
 Type theory

References

Bibliography 
 Program for ESSLLI 2019: Riga
 Program for ESSLLI 2015: Barcelona
 Program for ESSLLI 2014: Tübingen
 Program for ESSLLI 2013: Düsseldorf
 Program for ESSLLI 2012: Opole
 Program for ESSLLI 2011: Ljubljana
 Program for ESSLLI 2010: Copenhagen
 Program for ESSLLI 2009: Bordeaux
 Program for ESSLLI 2008: Hamburg
 Program for ESSLLI 2007: Dublin
 Program for ESSLLI 2006: Málaga
 Program for ESSLLI 2005: Edinburgh

External links 
 Association for Logic, Language and Information – official home page

Computer science conferences
Information technology organizations based in Europe
Linguistics conferences
Logic conferences
Mathematical logic organizations
Philosophical logic
Philosophy education
Summer schools